Bob Standfield (30 September 1915 – 1 October 1993) is a former Australian rules footballer who played with Carlton and Essendon in the Victorian Football League (VFL). In between his stints at Essendon and Carlton, Standfield played for Brunswick. His brother, Paul Standfield, also played in the VFL.

Notes

External links 

Bob Standfield's profile at Blueseum

1915 births
1993 deaths
Carlton Football Club players
Essendon Football Club players
Australian rules footballers from Victoria (Australia)
Leongatha Football Club players
Brunswick Football Club players